Joseph Emmanuel Arinze Eriobu Jr. (born February 12, 1992) is a Filipino-Nigerian basketball player.

Eriobu was a long-time player in the Philippine Basketball Association (PBA). He was drafted 4th overall by the Mahindra Floodbuster in the 2016 PBA draft. He would later play for the Phoenix Fuel Masters and Blackwater Elite before being left unsigned to any PBA team in 2019.

He would play for Hong Kong Eastern in the ASEAN Basketball League.

Eriobu would shift to 3x3, joining the Purefoods TJ Titans of the PBA 3x3 with the aim of eventually returning to the main 5x5 PBA league.

References

External links
 

1992 births
Living people
Blackwater Bossing players
Terrafirma Dyip players
Eastern Sports Club basketball players
Filipino people of Nigerian descent
Filipino men's basketball players
Mapúa Cardinals basketball players
Phoenix Super LPG Fuel Masters players
Small forwards
Terrafirma Dyip draft picks
Philippines national 3x3 basketball team players
PBA 3x3 players
Filipino men's 3x3 basketball players